Aleksandr Valeryevich Sklyarov (born 18 November 1971) is a former Kazakhstani football player.

Honours
Kairat
Kazakhstan Premier League champion: 1992
Kazakhstan Cup winner: 1992

Kaisar
Kazakhstan Cup winner: 1998–99

References

External links

1971 births
People from Shymkent
Living people
Soviet footballers
Kazakhstani footballers
Kazakhstan international footballers
FC Ordabasy players
FC Kairat players
FC Baltika Kaliningrad players
Kazakhstani expatriate footballers
Expatriate footballers in Russia
Russian Premier League players
FC Ural Yekaterinburg players
FC Kaisar players
FC Aktobe players
FC Taraz players
Kazakhstan Premier League players
Association football midfielders
Association football defenders